The 2019 WAFF Championship was an international football tournament held in Iraq from 30 July to 14 August 2019. The nine national teams involved in the tournament were required to register a squad of 23 players, including three goalkeepers. Only players in these squads were eligible to take part in the tournament.

The age listed for each player is on 30 July 2019, the first day of the tournament. The numbers of caps and goals listed for each player do not include any matches played after the start of tournament. The club listed is the club for which the player last played a competitive match prior to the tournament. The nationality for each club reflects the national association (not the league) to which the club is affiliated. A flag is included for coaches who are of a different nationality than their own national team.

Group A

Iraq
Coach:  Srečko Katanec

Iraq's 44-man preliminary squad was announced on 24 June 2019. The squad was reduced to 36 players on 12 July, then to 33 players on 20 July. The final squad was announced on 22 July.

Syria
Coach: Fajr Ibrahim

Syria's 26-man preliminary squad was announced on 23 July 2019. The final squad was announced on 29 July. Mohammed Al Wakid withdrew injured and was replaced by Ahmad Al Douni on 1 August.

Yemen
Coach: Sami Al Nash

Yemen's 30-man preliminary squad was announced on 11 July 2019. The final squad was announced on 27 July.

Palestine
Coach:  Noureddine Ould Ali

Palestine's final squad was announced on 26 July 2019.

Lebanon
Coach:  Liviu Ciobotariu

Lebanon's 42-man preliminary squad was announced on 28 June 2019. The final squad was announced on 24 July. Ali Sabeh withdrew injured and was replaced by Ali Daher on 31 July.

Group B

Saudi Arabia
Coach: Yousef Anbar

Saudi Arabia's 24-man preliminary squad was announced on 30 July 2019. The final squad was announced on 2 August.

Kuwait
Coach:  Romeo Jozak

Kuwait's final squad was announced on 28 July 2019.

Bahrain
Coach:  Hélio Sousa

Bahrain's 28-man preliminary squad was announced on 11 July 2019. The final squad was announced on 2 August.

Jordan
Coach:  Vital Borkelmans

Jordan's 26-man preliminary squad was announced on 17 July 2019. The final squad was announced on 30 July.

Statistics

Age
At , Syria's Firas Al-Khatib was the oldest player and oldest captain, and Jordan's Moataz Yaseen was the oldest goalkeeper.

Player representation by league system
League systems with the country's national team present are listed. In all, WAFF Championship squad members played for clubs in 14 countries.

 Three squads (Kuwait, Lebanon and Saudi Arabia) were made up entirely of players from the country's domestic league.
 The Yemen squad had the most players from a single foreign federation, with six players employed in Qatar.
 Of the countries not represented by a national team at the World Cup, Qatar's league provided the most squad members.

Player representation by club
Clubs with six or more players represented are listed.

Notes

References

Squads
WAFF Championship squads